Alexandrian riots may refer to:
 The Alexandrian riots (38), attacks directed against Jews in 38 CE
 The Alexandria riot (66), riots in 66 CE, coinciding with the outbreak of the First Jewish–Roman War

See also
 2005 Alexandria riot, an anti-Christian riot
 Bombardment of Alexandria, British military action in response to anti-Christian riots in 1882
 Food riots in the Middle East § Egypt